Malik Ayaz (Persian: ملک ایاز), son of Aymāq Abu'n-Najm, was a slave from Georgia who rose to the rank of officer and general in the army of Sultan Mahmud of Ghazni (also known as Mahmud Ghaznavi). Malik Ayaz's slave-generalship to Mahmud inspired poems and stories, and caused Muslim historians and Sufis to commemorate Malik Ayaz due to his unwavering feudalistic loyalty to Mahmud Ghaznavi. He was found dead in his bed in 1041, with suspicions of foul play being involved.

Early life and feudal career
In 1021, the Sultan Mahmud Ghaznavi raised Ayaz to kingship, awarding him the throne of Lahore, which the Sultan had taken after a long siege and a fierce battle in which the city was torched and depopulated. As the first Muslim governor of Lahore, he rebuilt and repopulated the city. He also added many important features, such as a masonry fort, which he built in the period of 1037–1040 on the ruins of the previous one, demolished in the fighting, and city gates (as recorded by Munshi Sujan Rae Bhandari, author of the Khulasatut Tawarikh (1596 C.E.). The present Lahore Fort is built in the same location. Under his rule the city became a cultural and academic center, renowned for poetry.

The tomb of Malik Ayaz can still be seen in the Rang Mahal area of Lahore. The tomb and the garden was destroyed by the Sikhs during their rule of Lahore and the tomb was rebuilt after the Partition of India.

Relationship with Mahmud of Ghazni 
The nature of the relationship between Mahmud and Ayaz is disputed. Some sources, particularly from Persian poetry, state that the two men were lovers. However, contemporary Ghaznavid authors like Gardizi, Farrukhi and Bayhaqi make no mention of a romantic relationship between Mahmud and Ayaz, rather describing Ayaz as either a commander, a noble or a close associate of Sultan Mahmud. Nizami Aruzi, writing roughly a century after the death of Mahmud, presents an alternative narrative about the relationship between Mahmud and Ayaz in his book Chahar Maqala, where they are not lovers, although Mahmud still is in love with Ayaz. Aruzi tells a story in which Mahmud, due to being a pious Muslim, suppresses his feelings and refuses to act upon them, resulting in an incident in which Mahmud orders Ayaz to cut off his tresses, so that he would less attracted to him thus be able to better restrain himself from committing a sin.

Malik Ayaz in Sufism
Amjad Farid Sabri, the slain Qawwal of Pakistan performed a song dedicated to Malik Ayaz, which praises the man for his feudalistic loyalty to Mahmud of Ghazni, the song also mentions Ajmer Sharif Dargah and how it attracts female devotees with the same devotion.

References

Bibliography
 

Ghaznavid officials
11th-century Muslims
11th-century rulers in Asia
History of Lahore
Former slaves
Iranian people of Georgian descent
Iranian slaves